Brann can refer to:

People
Surname
 Chris Brann (born 1972), American electronic music producer and remixer
 Eva Brann (born 1929), American educator; 2005 recipient of the National Humanities Medal
 Matt Brann (born 1980), Canadian drummer, best known for his work with Avril Lavigne
 Matthew W. Brann (born 1965), American judge in Pennsylvania
 William Cowper Brann (1855–1898), American journalist known as Brann the Iconoclast
Given name
 Brann Dailor (born 1975), American drummer, best known as a member of Mastodon

Ships
 , several Norwegian warships

Other
 Brann stadion, a football stadium in Bergen, Norway
 EHS Brann, a direct marketing, data and digital communications group based in London and Cirencester
 Sportsklubben Brann, a Norwegian football club from the city of Bergen

See also
 Braun (disambiguation)